Benin–Haiti relations refers to the current and historical relationship between Benin and Haiti.

Haiti and Benin maintain diplomatic relations with a Haitian office in Cotonou, although Benin does not currently maintain an official diplomatic presence in the country due to the 2010 earthquake. Benin contributed a contingency of 32 police/civilian personnel to MINUSTAH.

The two countries share an extensive cultural history by way of the Atlantic slave trade and the resulting importing of Vodou as a religious force in Haitian society. The earthquake was followed, among many reactions, by an outburst of solidarity prayers in Benin with the victims. Traditional ceremonies were organized to appease the spirits and seek the blessing of ancestors for the Haitians.

References

 
Haiti
Bilateral relations of Haiti